Bleninae is a monotypic subfamily of the moth family Nolidae. Its single genus, Blenina, was erected by Francis Walker in 1858.

Description
Palpi upturned, where the second joint reaching vertex of head, and third joint moderate length. Thorax smoothly scaled. Abdomen with slight tufts at the base on the dorsum. Forewings short and square, with nearly rectangular apex. Inner margin lobed near base. Slight tufts of raised scaled can be seen on antemedial, medial, and postmedial lines and on discocellulars. The areole are long and narrow. The retinaculum is bar shaped in the male. Hindwings with veins 2, 3, 4 and 5 arise from lower angle of cell.

Species
Blenina accipiens Walker, [1858]
Blenina albifascia Pinhey, 1968
Blenina angulipennis (Moore, 1882)
Blenina astarte (Fawcett, 1916)
Blenina brevicosta Prout, 1921
Blenina chloromelana (Mabille, 1890)
Blenina chlorophila Hampson, 1905
Blenina chrysochlora (Walker, 1865)
Blenina diagona Hampson, 1912
Blenina donans Walker, [1858]
Blenina ephesioides Pagenstecher, 1886
Blenina friederici Gaede, 1935
Blenina fumosa Swinhoe, 1905
Blenina hyblaeoides Kenrick, 1917
Blenina lichenopa (Meyrick, 1897)
Blenina lichenosa Moore, 1877
Blenina malachitis Hampson, 1905
Blenina malagasy Viette, 1979
Blenina metanyctea Hampson, 1905
Blenina metascia Hampson, 1914
Blenina miota Hampson, 1905
Blenina mniois Proute, 1925
Blenina obliquinaria Hampson, 1912
Blenina puloa Swinhoe, 1901
Blenina quadripuncta Hampson, 1902
Blenina quinaria Moore, 1882
Blenina richardi Viette, 1958
Blenina samphirophora Turner, 1920
Blenina senex (Butler, 1878)
Blenina smaragdina Bethune-Baker, 1906
Blenina squamifera (Wallengren, 1860)
Blenina viridata Bethune-Baker, 1906

References

Bleninae